Rhinodipterus is an extinct genus of prehistoric dipnoan sarcopterygians or lobe-finned fish, that lived in the Devonian Period, between 416 and 359 million years ago. It is believed to have inhabited shallow, salt-water reefs, and is one of the earliest known examples of marine lungfish. Research  based on an exceptionally well-preserved specimen from the Gogo Formation of Australia has shown that Rhinodipterus has cranial ribs attached to its braincase and was probably adapted for air-breathing to some degree as living lungfish are. This could be the only case known for a marine lungfish with air-breathing adaptations.

See also

 Sarcopterygii
 List of sarcopterygians
 List of prehistoric bony fish

References

 Clement, A. & Long, J.A. 2010. Air-breathing adaptation in a marine Devonian lungfish. Biology Letters 6: 509–512.
 Long, J.A. & Trinajstic, K. 2010. The Late Devonian Gogo Formation Lagerstatte –Exceptional preservation and Diversity in early Vertebrates. Annual Review of Earth and Planetary Sciences 38: 665-680

External links
 Rhinodipterus at rsbl.royalsocietypublishing.org

Prehistoric lungfish genera
Gogo fauna